Tyler George Reddick (born January 11, 1996) is an American professional stock car racing driver. He competes full-time in the NASCAR Cup Series, driving the No. 45 Toyota Camry for 23XI Racing and part-time in the NASCAR Xfinity Series, driving the No. 24 Toyota Supra for Sam Hunt Racing. He is a two-time champion in the NASCAR Xfinity Series, winning consecutive titles in 2018 and 2019. Reddick was the victor in the closest finish in NASCAR's top three series, edging out Elliott Sadler at Daytona International Speedway during the 2018 Xfinity Series season.

Racing career

Early career

Reddick began his racing career at the age of four, competing in Outlaw Karts; soon after he was competing in mini sprints, midgets, dirt late models, and sprint cars. He was the youngest driver to qualify for the pole position at Eldora Speedway World 100, the youngest driver to win at the East Bay Winter Nationals, and the youngest winning driver in the Lucas Oil Late Model Dirt Series. He is also the youngest driver ever to qualify for a feature race in World of Outlaws sprint car racing.

Reddick made his debut in the ARCA Racing Series in 2012; in October of that year, Reddick won in his first career start in the NASCAR K&N Pro Series East at Rockingham Speedway.

Camping World Truck Series
Reddick made his debut in the NASCAR Camping World Truck Series in April 2013, driving for Ken Schrader Racing at Rockingham Speedway; he was involved in an accident during the race, and finished 30th.

In November 2013, it was announced that Reddick had been signed by Brad Keselowski Racing to compete in the Camping World Truck Series; he was scheduled to drive the team's No. 19 Ford in 16 events in the series in 2014, before running the full series schedule for the team in 2015. On February 20, 2015, Reddick got his first career victory in the Camping World Truck Series at Daytona. On May 29, Reddick got his second career victory in the Truck Series at Dover. He led the points during the later stages of the summer until wrecking at Mosport, at which point he surrendered the lead to eventual champion Erik Jones. Reddick would ultimately finish second in his first full year of competition.

In 2016, Reddick returned to BKR switching the No. 19 to the No. 29, with his new BKR teammate Hemric using his previous No. 19. Reddick started the season with a crash at Daytona, finishing 18th.
Reddick would have been a contention for the championship in 2016, but he failed to make it into the playoff. Reddick would win at Las Vegas, for his first victory of the season. On November 10, 2016, it was announced that Reddick would not return to BKR next season.

Xfinity Series
Eight days after the BKR announcement, Reddick joined Chip Ganassi Racing to drive the No. 42 Chevrolet Camaro in the Xfinity Series on a part-time basis starting in 2017. In September that year, he won his first Xfinity race at Kentucky Speedway after leading 66 laps and winning with a 14-second advantage over teammate Brennan Poole. A month later, Reddick won his first Xfinity pole at Kansas Speedway.

On September 14, 2017, Reddick was signed by JR Motorsports to a full-time schedule for the 2018 Xfinity season, replacing William Byron, who was promoted to the Monster Energy NASCAR Cup Series, in the No. 24 car. On February 17, 2018, Reddick beat teammate Elliott Sadler in a photo finish to win the season-opening race at Daytona. At a margin of .0004 seconds, it is the closest finish in NASCAR history. Although he did not win again for the remainder of the regular season, he qualified for the playoffs and reached the Championship Round. In the season finale at Homestead, Reddick won the race and his first Xfinity Series championship.

On October 31, 2018, it was announced that Reddick will switch from JR Motorsports to Richard Childress Racing in 2019. Reddick explained that his move to RCR was for a better chance to run in the Monster Energy NASCAR Cup Series in the near future. In April 2019, Reddick won his first race with RCR in the MoneyLion 300 at Talladega. At the end of the Kansas race, Reddick got into a fight with Cole Custer on pit road. At the 2019 O'Reilly Auto Parts 300 at Texas Motor Speedway, Reddick scored his fourth pole of the season and would lead 32 laps before crashing and finishing 29th in the final order. Reddick won at Homestead to claim his second consecutive Xfinity Series championship.

Reddick returned to the Xfinity Series for the 2021 season opener at Daytona, driving a newly-opened No. 03 car for Our Motorsports. However, the car missed the race as qualifying was rained out. Two weeks later at Homestead, Reddick moved to RSS Racing's No. 23 in a partnership with Our; he finished second behind RCR's Myatt Snider, but was disqualified when his car failed the rear height requirements during post-race inspection. In May, he signed with Jordan Anderson Racing to race at Circuit of the Americas.

In 2022, Reddick drove the Big Machine Racing No. 48 to the team's first win at Texas.

In 2023, Reddick would drive the No. 24 Toyota for Sam Hunt Racing for select races.

Cup Series

2019
On February 1, 2019, it was announced that Reddick would make his Cup Series debut at the 2019 Daytona 500, driving the No. 31 car for RCR. After qualifying for the race as an open (non-charter) car, he started 39th. Reddick was involved in two incidents during the race: on lap 159, as he was about to pit, contact by Cody Ware sent him airborne before being hit by Jimmie Johnson, ripping Johnson's left side; on lap 191, he was involved in "The Big One" that collected 20 other drivers.

In April, Reddick participated in qualifying at Talladega, driving the No. 62 Beard Motorsports car in place of Brendan Gaughan, who was attending his son's communion. Reddick was 29th fastest, but Gaughan started at the rear for the race under NASCAR's driver change rules. In only his second MENCS start at Kansas, Reddick finished ninth.

On October 2, 2019, RCR officially announced Reddick as the driver of the No. 8 Chevrolet for the 2020 season.

2020
Reddick scored his first top ten of the 2020 season at the first Darlington spring race, finishing 7th. At Homestead, he ran in the top-five almost all day and finished 4th, his then best-career finish, despite almost losing the position on the last lap after thinking that the race ended a lap early.

Reddick nearly won the 2020 GEICO 500 at Talladega, controlling the lead in the late stages but ultimately losing it with four laps to go and finishing 20th. Reddick also contended with RCR teammate Austin Dillon for the victory at Texas after opting not to pit during a caution caused by fellow rookie Quin Houff spinning out, which moved him to the lead with 23 laps to go as a result. Reddick finished a then career-best 2nd-place to Dillon, marking an RCR 1–2 finish for the first time since the 2011 Good Sam Club 500. Reddick posted 3 top-5 finishes and 9 top-10 finishes. He was in playoff contention for most of the year, being 19th in points heading into the regular-season finale in the Coke Zero Sugar 400, the regular-season finale. He nearly won the race, but in the late stages, he attempted to clear the No. 18 of Kyle Busch, but had not fully passed him and instead collided with Busch. The contact lost Reddick the lead and he was caught up in another wreck, resulting in him missing the playoffs. He finished the season out 19th in points.

2021: First Playoff Appearance

In August 2020, Reddick announced that he would be returning to the No. 8 for RCR for a second year. Reddick again was close to winning, this time at Homestead-Miami Speedway. Reddick climbed up to fourth with roughly ten to go, and battled with Martin Truex Jr. and Kyle Larson. However, when he finally got by both of them for good, he did not have enough time to catch race winner William Byron, despite having the fastest car on the track. Reddick's consistency and a fifth-place finish at the 2021 Coke Zero Sugar 400 at Daytona enabled him to make the playoffs for the first time. Reddick was eliminated from the playoffs following the conclusion of the Round of 16 at Bristol. He finished the season 13th in the points standings.

2022: First Cup wins and final season at RCR

Reddick began the 2022 season with a 35th place finish at the 2022 Daytona 500. At the Bristol dirt race, he battled Chase Briscoe for the lead on the closing laps when Briscoe lost control and caused both cars to slide on the final turn, leading to Reddick finishing second to Kyle Busch. At Road America, Reddick held off Chase Elliott to score his first career Cup Series win. On July 12, 2022, it was announced that Reddick had signed with 23XI Racing for a full-time Cup ride in 2024. At the Indianapolis Road Course, Reddick held off the field in overtime to win his second race of the season. Reddick was eliminated in the Round of 16 after being involved in a multi-car pileup at the Bristol night race. Despite his elimination, he scored his third career win at Texas a week later. Reddick retired from the Martinsville playoff race early, as he was not feeling well. He finished the season 14th in the points standings.

2023
On October 15, 2022, 23XI Racing announced that it bought out the remainder of Reddick's contract from RCR to replace Kurt Busch in the No. 45 for the 2023 season.

Personal life
Reddick was born in Corning, California.

Reddick won naming rights to his firstborn by winning the 2019 NASCAR Xfinity Series championship.

Motorsports career results

Stock car career summary 

† As Reddick was a guest driver, he was ineligible for championship points.

NASCAR
(key) (Bold – Pole position awarded by qualifying time. Italics – Pole position earned by points standings or practice time. * – Most laps led.)

Cup Series

Daytona 500

Xfinity Series

Camping World Truck Series

 Season still in progress
 Ineligible for series points

K&N Pro Series East

ARCA Racing Series
(key) (Bold – Pole position awarded by qualifying time. Italics – Pole position earned by points standings or practice time. * – Most laps led.)

References

External links

 
 

Living people
1996 births
People from Tehama County, California
Racing drivers from California
NASCAR drivers
ARCA Menards Series drivers
Chip Ganassi Racing drivers
Richard Childress Racing drivers
NASCAR Xfinity Series champions
NASCAR Xfinity Series regular season champions
KCMG drivers
JR Motorsports drivers